The Six Nations Rivermen are a Senior box lacrosse team. The team played in the City of Ohsweken, Ontario, Canada and participate in the OLA Senior B Lacrosse League. They are the defending 2015 Presidents Cup National Champions and two-time defending Ontario Lacrosse Association Senior B Champions.

History

The Rivermen were founded in 2001 as the Six Nations Crash, they were soon renamed the Mohawk Stars. The team sat out the 2012 season to reorganize and came back as the Rivermen.

Since returning as the Rivermen, the team has found its stride. In 2013, the Rivermen finished the season in second place with 11 wins and 5 losses. The Rivermen would beat the Norwood James Gang 3-straight in the semi-final, but were swept in 3 games by the eventual Presidents Cup champions, the St. Catharines Saints.

In 2014, Six Nations would finish the season in third place with 11 wins and 5 losses. In the league quarter-final they would defeat the Sarnia Beavers 2-games-to-none and in the semi-final they would upset the defending national champions with a 3-games-to-none sweep. In the league final, the Rivermen would play the Ennismore James Gang, the first place team in the league, and beat them 3-games-to-1 to clinch the OLA championship.  With a berth into the Presidents Cup, the Rivermen would travel to Coquitlam, British Columbia to compete against the best of the country. They opened the tournament with a 14–12 loss to the Onondaga Redhawks and a 10–8 loss to the St. Albert Miners. The Rivermen came together in the next game and beat the Kahnawake Mohawks 9–8, then the Nanaimo Timbermen 8–5, Akwesasne Outlawz 14–9, and the Tri-City Bandits 9–7 to finish the round robin 4–2–0 and in fourth place. In the semi-final, the Rivermen would beat Kahnawake 8–4 to get to the finals. Despite leading most of the game, in the final the Onondaga Redhawks would come from behind to win the national title with a 9–7 win.  Warren Hill and Wayne VanEvery would be named to the all-star teams.

In 2015, the Rivermen would the regular season title, the OLA championship, and the Presidents Cup. After finishing in first place in the OSBLL with a record of 12 wins and 4 losses, the Rivermen would sweep both the Oakville Titans and the Brooklin Merchants with 3-game-sweeps.  The Rivermen then travelled to St. Catharines, Ontario to compete for the Presidents Cup for the second straight year. Six Nations began with a 14–4 win over the Rockyview Knights, then a 14–11 loss to the Snake Island Muskies, but the Rivermen would turn around their fortunes with a 15–7 win over the Nanaimo Timbermen. In the semi-final, the Rivermen would avenge their 2014 title loss with a 12–10 win over the Onondaga Redhawks, before beating the Capital Region Axemen 14–11 to take the national championship.

Season-by-season results

Presidents Cup results

See also
OLA Senior B Lacrosse League
Presidents Cup (box lacrosse)

References

External links
OLA website

Ontario Lacrosse Association teams
Lacrosse of the Iroquois Confederacy
Lacrosse clubs established in 2001
2001 establishments in Ontario
Six Nations of the Grand River